Gabriela Velasco Andreu (born 1 April 1985) is a former professional Spanish tennis player.

Velasco Andreu won 12 doubles titles on the ITF Women's Circuit in her career. On 20 June 2005, she reached her best singles ranking of world number 369. On 17 July 2006, she peaked at number 229 in the doubles rankings. Velasco Andreu made her WTA Tour debut at the 2003 Copa Colsanitas. She retired from professional tennis in 2007.

ITF finals

Singles (0–4)

Doubles (12–17)

References

External links
 
 

1985 births
Living people
Spanish female tennis players